Iron Woman or Ironwoman may refer to:

 The Iron Woman, a 1993 science fiction novel by Ted Hughes
 The Iron Woman (film), a 1916 American silent film
 The Iron Woman (novel), a 1911 novel of manners by Margaret Deland
 Ironman (surf lifesaving) for women
 Ironman Triathlon for women
"La Dame de Fer", French nickname for the Eiffel Tower

See also

 Iron (disambiguation)
 Iron Baron (disambiguation)
 Iron Duke (disambiguation)
 Iron Man (disambiguation)
 Iron Lady (disambiguation)
 Iron Lord (disambiguation)
 Iron Maiden (disambiguation)
 Woman of Steel (disambiguation)